Chazara enervata is a butterfly species belonging to the family Nymphalidae. It can be found from Kopet-Dagh across Iran and Afghanistan to Pakistan and across the Pamir-Alay to E. Tian-Shan and the S. Altai.

The wingspan is 45–60 mm. The butterflies fly from May to September.

External links
 Satyrinae of the Western Palearctic - Chazara enervata

Chazara
Butterflies described in 1881
Fauna of Pakistan
Butterflies of Asia